Liz Hanbidge is a Democratic member of the Pennsylvania House of Representatives, representing the 61st Legislative District in Montgomery County. The 61st Legislative District includes parts of Whitpain Township, Lower Gwynedd Township and Upper Gwynedd Township, Towamencin Township, and North Wales Borough.

Early life and education 
Liz Hanbidge earned a bachelor's degree from University of Pennsylvania as well as graduate degrees in Psychology from University of Oxford and Harvard University. She received her law degree from University of Wisconsin. Prior to joining the state legislature, she practiced law in Montgomery County. Hanbidge also teaches civics to sixth graders at Gwyn-Nor Elementary and East Norriton Middle School, working in conjunction with the local bar association.

Political career 
On November 6, 2018, Liz Hanbidge was elected to represent the 61st Legislative District, defeating long time Republican incumbent Kate Harper. She is the first Democrat to serve the district since its formation in 1969. She currently serves on the Commerce, Agriculture & Rural Affairs, and Local Government committees and was appointed Montgomery County Vice Chair of the House Southeast Delegation. 
She has been endorsed by President Obama and Planned Parenthood PA.

Committee assignments 

 Agriculture & Rural Affairs
 Children & Youth
 Judiciary
 Local Government

References

External links
Pennsylvania House of Representatives - Liz Hanbidge official PA House website

Living people
Democratic Party members of the Pennsylvania House of Representatives
Women state legislators in Pennsylvania
21st-century American politicians
21st-century American women politicians
University of Pennsylvania alumni
University of Wisconsin Law School alumni
Pennsylvania lawyers
Alumni of the University of Oxford
Harvard University alumni
Year of birth missing (living people)